Othius is a genus of beetles belonging to the family Staphylinidae.

The species of this genus are found in Europe and Japan.

Species:
 Othius acifer Assing, 1998 
 Othius acutus Assing, 1999

References

Staphylinidae
Staphylinidae genera